The Golden Melody Award for Best Male Mandarin Singer is an award given by the Ministry of Culture of Taiwan. It was first presented in 1990 as Best Male Singer.

The award has been won by Eason Chan and Johnny Yin the most times, with three wins. Wang Leehom is the artist with the most nominations with nine.

Winners and nominees

Best Male Singer (1990–1991)

Best Mandarin Male Singer (1991–1996)

Popular Music: Best Mandarin Male Singer (1997–2006)

Popular Music: Vocal Category - Best Mandarin Male Singer (2007–2016)

Popular Music: Vocal - Individual Awards - Best Male Vocalist Mandarin (2017–present)

Statistics

Most wins

Most nominations

References

Golden Melody Awards